This is a list of colleges and universities in the U.S. State of Colorado which range in age and focus of programs. This list also includes other educational institutions providing higher education, meaning tertiary, quaternary, and, in some cases, post-secondary education. The State Commission data is also provided.


Colorado Commission on Higher Education
This table includes Locations, Governance, Institution Focus(es), The Enrollment Head count (the sum of undergraduate and graduate students), the number of Full-time equivalent students, and the percentage of these students which qualify as residents of the State.

Four-year Institutions

Defunct Private Colleges and Universities

State institutions

Two-year institutions
 Aims Community College
 Loveland Campus
 Windsor Campus
 Fort Lupton Campus
 Arapahoe Community College
 Parker Campus
 Castle Rock Campus
 Colorado Mountain College
 Residential Campuses
 Leadville Residential Campus, Leadville
 Roaring Fork Residential Campus in Spring Valley, Glenwood Springs
 Steamboat Residential Campus, Steamboat Springs
 Community Campuses
 Aspen Campus, Aspen
 Summit Campus, Breckenridge and Dillon
 Timberline Campus, Buena Vista and Salida
 Roaring Fork Campus, Carbondale and Glenwood Springs
 Vail-Eagle Valley Campus, Edwards and Eagle
 Rifle Campus, Rifle
 Colorado Northwestern Community College
 Craig Campus, Craig
 Rangely Campus, Rangely
 Community College of Aurora
 Community College of Denver
 Front Range Community College
 Boulder County Campus, Longmont, Colorado
 Larimer Campus, Ft. Collins, Colorado
 Westminster Campus, Westminster, Colorado
 Brighton Center, Brighton, Colorado
 Lamar Community College
 Morgan Community College
 Northeastern Junior College
 Otero College
 Pikes Peak State College
 Pueblo Community College
 Fremont Campus, Cañon City
Southwest Campus, Mancos
 Red Rocks Community College
 Trinidad State College
 Trinidad Campus, Trinidad
 Alamosa Campus, Alamosa
 Western Colorado Community College
 Bishop Campus, Grand Junction

Two-year, for-profit, regionally accredited institutions 
 Lincoln College of Technology in Denver

See also

Outline of Colorado
Index of Colorado-related articles
 List of college athletic programs in Colorado
 Colorado Community College System
 List of colleges and universities
 List of colleges and universities by country
 Wikimedia Commons: Universities and colleges in Colorado

References

External links

Department of Education listing of accredited institutions in Colorado

 
Colorado education-related lists
Colorado geography-related lists
Education in Colorado
Colorado, List of colleges and universities in